Proctotrupoidea is a hymenopteran superfamily containing seven extant families, though others have been recognized in the past, most of these having been removed to a recently erected superfamily Diaprioidea. Of the remaining families, only Proctotrupidae contains a substantial number of species, with over 400 described. The others are small, often relictual groups. See links for individual families for details of life history and diversity.

See also
 Tree of Life Apocrita; shows polyphyletic Proctotrupoidea.

References

 
Apocrita superfamilies